Zbigniew Żarnowiecki (born 15 April 1927) is a Polish former rower who competed in the 1952 Summer Olympics.

References

1927 births
Living people
Polish male rowers
Olympic rowers of Poland
Rowers at the 1952 Summer Olympics
People from Przemyśl
Sportspeople from Podkarpackie Voivodeship